Taein Gyeong clan is a Korean clan. Their Bon-gwan is in Jeongeup, North Jeolla Province. There are 3603 members of this clan. When Gyeong Yeo song unified Korea and founded Gija Joseon with Gija, he taught etiquette, agriculture, rice farming, sericulture, weaving and government systems to Koreans.

See also 
 Korean clan names of foreign origin

References

External links 
 

 
Korean clan names of Chinese origin
Gyeong clans
Gija Joseon